Antonio Gabica (born October 2, 1972) is a Philippine pool player. Gabica was the runner up at the 2013 WPA World Nine-ball Championship.

Titles
 2008 Mandaluyong Mayor's Cup
 2007 Philippine 9-Ball Open
 2007 San Miguel Beer World 9-Ball Challenge
 2007 Southeast Asian Games Nine-ball Doubles
 2006 Philippine Sportsman of the Year
 2006 Asian Games Nine-ball Singles
 2005 Southeast Asian Games Eight-ball Doubles
 2004 MotoLite Philippine 9-Ball Open

References

External links
 Profile on azbilliards.com

1972 births
Filipino pool players
Living people
Asian Games medalists in cue sports
Cue sports players at the 2006 Asian Games
Asian Games gold medalists for the Philippines
Asian Games silver medalists for the Philippines
Medalists at the 2006 Asian Games
Southeast Asian Games medalists in cue sports
Southeast Asian Games gold medalists for the Philippines
Southeast Asian Games silver medalists for the Philippines
Southeast Asian Games bronze medalists for the Philippines